The Marianna Historic District is a U.S. historic district (designated as such on May 23, 1997) located in Marianna, Florida. The district is bounded by Davis, Park, Jackson, and Wynn Streets. It contains 181 historic contributing buildings and one contributing object.

It includes the Theophilus West House, which was separately listed on the National Register.

References

External links

Geography of Jackson County, Florida
Historic districts on the National Register of Historic Places in Florida
National Register of Historic Places in Jackson County, Florida